Haaga is a district and a former municipality in the  Western major district of Helsinki with a population of 25,435.

Haaga is divided into four subareas, which are Pohjois-Haaga (northern Haaga), Etelä-Haaga (southern Haaga), Kivihaka and Lassila. It is home to the Haaga Rhododendron Park.

Haaga has two railway stations: Huopalahti railway station in south and Pohjois-Haaga railway station in north. Frequent users of the trains are students attending Haaga-Helia University of Applied Sciences, as their campuses are spread out between 25–45 minutes between each other by train.

Studies at the University include: business, finance, hospitality and tourism (including masters level), information technology, and management assistance. All these courses are available to exchange students interested in attending.

See also 
 Haaga Rhododendron Park
 Pitäjänmäki
 Pasila

References 

 
Former municipalities of Finland